In econometrics and statistics, a structural break is an unexpected change over time in the parameters of regression models, which can lead to huge forecasting errors and unreliability of the model in general. This issue was popularised by David Hendry, who argued that lack of stability of coefficients frequently caused forecast failure, and therefore we must routinely test for structural stability.  Structural stability − i.e., the time-invariance of regression coefficients − is a central issue in all applications of linear regression models.

Structural break tests

A single break in mean with a known breakpoint

Other forms of structural breaks

Other challenges occur where there are:
Case 1: a known number of breaks in mean with unknown break points;
Case 2: an unknown number of breaks in mean with unknown break points;
Case 3: breaks in variance.

The Chow test is not applicable in these situations, since it only applies to models with a known breakpoint and where the error variance remains constant before and after the break.

In general, the CUSUM (cumulative sum) and CUSUM-sq (CUSUM squared) tests can be used to test the constancy of the coefficients in a model. The bounds test can also be used. For cases 1 and 2, the sup-Wald (i.e., the supremum of a set of Wald statistics), sup-LM (i.e., the supremum of a set of Lagrange multiplier statistics), and sup-LR (i.e., the supremum of a set of likelihood ratio statistics) tests developed by Andrews (1993, 2003) may be used to test for parameter instability when the number and location of structural breaks are unknown. These tests were shown to be superior to the CUSUM test in terms of statistical power, and are the most commonly used tests for the detection of structural change involving an unknown number of breaks in mean with unknown break points. The sup-Wald, sup-LM, and sup-LR tests are asymptotic in general (i.e., the asymptotic critical values for these tests are applicable for sample size  as ), and involve the assumption of homoskedasticity across break points for finite samples; however, an exact test with the sup-Wald statistic may be obtained for a linear regression model with a fixed number of regressors and independent and identically distributed (IID) normal errors. A method developed by Bai and Perron (2003) also allows for the detection of multiple structural breaks from data.

The MZ test developed by Maasoumi, Zaman, and Ahmed (2010) allows for the simultaneous detection of one or more breaks in both mean and variance at a known break point. The sup-MZ test developed by Ahmed, Haider, and Zaman (2016) is a generalization of the MZ test which allows for the detection of breaks in mean and variance at an unknown break point.

Structural breaks in cointegration models

For a cointegration model, the Gregory–Hansen test (1996) can be used for one unknown structural break, the Hatemi–J test (2006) can be used for two unknown breaks and the Maki (2012) test allows for multiple structural breaks.

Statistical packages

There are several statistical packages that can be used to find structural breaks, including R, GAUSS, and Stata, among others.

See also
 Structural change
 Change detection
 Great Moderation

References

Change detection
Time series
Panel data
Econometric modeling
Regression analysis